The Language Atlas of China, published in two parts in 1987 and 1989, maps the distribution of both the varieties of Chinese and minority languages of China.
It was a collaborative effort by the Australian Academy of the Humanities and the Chinese Academy of Social Sciences, published simultaneously in the original Chinese and in English translation.
Endymion Wilkinson rated this joint venture "outstanding".

A second edition was published in 2012.

Classification of Chinese varieties 

The atlas organizes the varieties of Chinese in a hierarchy of groupings, following the work of Li Rong:
 supergroups (大区 dàqū): Mandarin and Min
 groups (区 qū): Jin, Wu, Hui, Xiang, Gan, Hakka, Yue, Pinghua and groups within Mandarin and Min
 subgroups (片 piàn)
 clusters (小片 xiǎopiàn) are only identified for some subgroups
 local dialects (点 diǎn): localities that were surveyed

Contents 
The atlas contains 36 colour maps, divided into three sections:
 A. General maps
 A1 Languages in China
 A2 Chinese dialects in China
 A3 National minorities in China
 A4 Minority languages in China
 A5 Language distribution (Guangxi Zhuang Autonomous Region)
 B. Maps of Chinese dialects
 B1 Mandarin-1 (Northeastern China)
 B2 Mandarin-2 (Beijing, Tianjin, Hebei and western Shandong)
 B3 Mandarin-3 (Henan, Shandong, northern Anhui, northern Jiangsu)
 B4 Mandarin-4 (Shaanxi, Gansu, Qinghai, Ningxia)
 B5 Mandarin-5 (Xinjiang Uygur Autonomous Region)
 B6 Mandarin-6 (Southwestern China)
 B7 Jin group (Shanxi and adjacent areas)
 B8 Chinese dialects (southeastern China)
 B9 Wu group (Zhejiang, Shanghai, southern Jiangsu)
 B10 Chinese dialects (southern Anhui area)
 B11 Chinese dialects (Hunan and Jiangxi)
 B12 Min supergroup (Fujian, Taiwan, eastern Guangdong and Hainan Island)
 B13 Chinese dialects: Guangdong (mainland)
 B14 Chinese dialects (Guangxi Zhuang Autonomous Region)
 B15 Hakka group
 B16 Chinese dialects overseas: (a) insular Southeast Asia (b) other parts of the world
 C. Maps of minority languages
 C1 Minority languages in northern China
 C2 Mongolian languages
 C3 Mongolian dialects
 C4 Turkic (Tujue) languages
 C5 Manchu-Tungus languages
 C6 Minority languages in southern China
 C7 Kam-Tai languages
 C8 Miao-Yao languages
 C9 Dialects of the Miao language
 C10 Tibeto-Burman stock languages
 C11 Tibetan dialects
 C12 Minority languages (Guangxi Zhuang Autonomous Region)
 C13 Minority languages (Yunnan province)
 C14 Minority languages on Hainan and Taiwan islands

Each map is accompanied by a blue sheet of the same size containing explanatory notes.

Second edition 
Work began on revised edition in 2002.
The work was published in 2012 as a joint venture between the Chinese Academy of Social Sciences and the City University of Hong Kong.
It consists of two volumes, dealing respectively with varieties of Chinese and minority languages.
The revision follows the same structure as the first edition, but the number of maps has increased to 79, and the explanatory text is greatly expanded.
The number of minority languages covered has also increased from 81 to 130.

See also 

 Demographics of China
 Languages of China
 Languages of Hong Kong
 Languages of Macau

References

External links 
 "Digital Language Atlas of China", compiled by Lawrence W. Crissman, version 6, 5 October 2012, Australian Centre for the Asian Spatial Information and Analysis Network (ACASIAN) GIS Data Archive.  (Harvard Dataverse). The full dataset consists of eight layers in ESRI shapefile format derived from the Language Atlas of China.  The initial release (under Creative Commons v3.0 – Attribution-NonCommercial-ShareAlike) contains only a draft of the first layer, representing maps A1–4 and marking language families and major Chinese dialect groups, but not individual non-Chinese languages or subgroups of Chinese dialects.

Varieties of Chinese
Languages of China
China
Books about China